Zgornji Mamolj (in older sources Gorenji Mamolj) is a former settlement in the Municipality of Litija in central Slovenia. It is now part of the village of Mamolj. The area is part of the traditional region of Lower Carniola and is now included with the rest of the municipality in the Central Sava Statistical Region.

Geography
Zgornji Mamolj stands in the western part of Mamolj, on a side road off of the main road to Gradiške Laze.

History
Zgornji Mamolj had a population of 50 living in nine houses in 1900. Zgornji Mamolj was annexed by Mamolj in 1953, ending its existence as a separate settlement.

References

External links
Zgornji Mamolj on Geopedia

Populated places in the Municipality of Litija